Kimurayama Mamoru (born 13 July 1981 as Mamoru Kimura) is a former professional sumo wrestler from Wakayama Prefecture, Japan. His highest rank was maegashira 7. He is now a coach at Kasugano stable. He was the only wrestler in the elite ranks in his time from Wakayama Prefecture.

Career
Born in Gobo, he was an amateur champion at Toyo University, but did not have enough collegiate titles to receive makushita tsukedashi status and join professional sumo in the third highest makushita division, instead beginning at the bottom of the rankings in March 2004. He joined Kasugano stable, run by another Wakayama Prefecture native, the former sekiwake Tochinowaka. His shikona or fighting name was adapted from his own surname, which is also a time-honoured name in Kasugano stable, being the name of a gyoji or referee, Kimura Soshiro, who ran the stable in the early 20th century.

Kimurayama reached sekitori status in January 2008 upon promotion to the second highest jūryō division and won his first yūshō or tournament championship in the following tournament with a 12–3 record. He made his debut in the top makuuchi division two tournaments later at maegashira 12, but fell short with a 7–8 record. He won his second jūryō championship in March 2010, after a three way playoff with Kōryū and Tamaasuka. He did not manage a kachi-koshi or winning record in the top division until his eighth try in July 2010. This performance, and another 8-7 in September, resulted in promotion to what was to be his highest career rank of maegashira 7 for the November 2010 tournament.

He actually moved up from maegashira 17 to maegashira 15 despite only scoring 7–8 in the May 2011 Technical Examination tournament, due to the large number of retirements caused by a match-fixing scandal.  Despite recording his fifth successive make-koshi in September 2011, he remained in makuuchi for the November tournament. After yet another losing score there he was finally demoted back to juryo in January 2012 and spent only one more tournament in the top division, in September 2012. Of his total of 16 tournaments fought in the top division, only two resulted in winning records (both 8-7), and his record there was 101 wins against 139 losses.

Retirement from sumo
Kimurayama chose to retire and take on an elder name rather than being demoted to makushita after the January 2014 tournament. He has secured the Iwatomo toshiyori-kabu, one of 105 shares in the Japan Sumo Association, and now works as a coach at Kasugano stable. He is now known as Iwatomo Oyakata.

Fighting style
Kimurayama favoured pushing and thrusting techniques as opposed to fighting on the mawashi. His most common winning kimarite (or technique) was a simple oshi-dashi, or push out. He frequently employed the sidestepping henka move at the tachi-ai or initial charge, and consequently won many bouts by hiki-otoshi, the pull down, and tsuki-otoshi, the thrust over.

Career record

See also
Glossary of sumo terms
List of sumo tournament second division champions
List of past sumo wrestlers
List of sumo elders

References

External links
 

1981 births
Living people
Japanese sumo wrestlers
Sumo people from Wakayama Prefecture
People from Gobō, Wakayama